Maria may refer to:

People
 Mary, mother of Jesus
 Maria (given name), a popular given name in many languages

Place names

Extraterrestrial
170 Maria, a Main belt S-type asteroid discovered in 1877
Lunar maria (plural of mare), large, dark basaltic plains on Earth's Moon

Terrestrial
Maria, Maevatanana, Madagascar
Maria, Quebec, Canada
Maria, Siquijor, the Philippines
María, Spain, in Andalusia
Îles Maria, French Polynesia
María de Huerva, Aragon, Spain
Villa Maria (disambiguation)

Arts, entertainment, and media

Films
Maria (1947 film), Swedish film
Maria (1975 film), Swedish film
Maria (2003 film), Romanian film
Maria (2019 film), Filipino film
Maria (2021 film), Canadian film directed by Alec Pronovost
Maria (Sinhala film), Sri Lankan upcoming film

Literature
María (novel), an 1867 novel by Jorge Isaacs
 Maria (Ukrainian novel), a 1934 novel by the Ukrainian writer Ulas Samchuk
Maria (play), a 1935 play by Isaac Babel
Maria, a poetic novel (1825) by Antoni Malczewski
Maria: or, The Wrongs of Woman, a 1798 unfinished novel by Mary Wollstonecraft

Music
Artists
Maria (band), a Japanese all-female band
Maria (Danish singer), born 1978
Maria (South African singer), 1945–1980
Maria (Bulgarian singer), born 1982
Maria (Bruneian singer), born 1989

Albums
Maria (album), a 1995 album by Jane Siberry
María (EP), a 2020 EP by Hwasa

Songs
"María" (Cátulo Castillo song), 1945
"Maria" (West Side Story song), from the musical West Side Story Sondheim, Bernstein, 1956 covered by Gene Pitney, The Delta Rhythm Boys, P. J. Proby and others
"Maria" (Rodgers and Hammerstein song), from the musical The Sound of Music 1959
"María" (Franco song), 1988
"María" (Ricky Martin song), by Ricky Martin, 1995
"Maria" (Blondie song), 1999
"María" (Östen med Resten song), 2003
"Maria" (US5 song), 2005
"Maria (I Like It Loud)", by Scooter, a cover of "I Like It Loud" by Marc Acardipane
"Maria", by Animal Liberation Orchestra from Roses & Clover
"María", by Café Tacuba from Café Tacuba
"Maria", song by David Sylvian from the album Secrets of the Beehive
"Maria", by Gackt from Rebirth
"Maria", a song by Lorna Cordeiro with Mohammad Rafi
"Maria", by Green Day from International Superhits!
"Maria", by Guano Apes from Proud Like a God
"Maria", by The Jacksons from 2300 Jackson Street
"Maria", by Jean Ferrat
"Maria", by Joe Dassin
"Maria", by Justin Bieber from Believe
"Maria", by Kendji Girac
"Maria", by Kim Ah-joong from the Korean film 200 Pounds Beauty
"Maria", by Men at Work from Two Hearts
"María", by Pepe Aguilar from No Lo Había Dicho
"Maria", by Six Organs of Admittance from their self-titled album
"Maria", by Rage Against the Machine from The Battle of Los Angeles
"Maria", by Redgum from the album Virgin Ground
"Maria", by Robert Earl Keen from West Textures
"Maria", by Wu-Tang Clan from Wu-Tang Forever
"Oh Maria", by Louis Prima from The Wildest!
"Maria", By Eduardo di Capua
"Maria (You Were the Only One)", by Michael Jackson from Got to Be There

Operas
Maria, a 1903-4 opera by Roman Statkowski (based on the poetic novel by Antoni Malczewski)

Television
Maria (TV series), Kenyan drama series

Computing and technology
Maria (reachability analyzer), a reachability analyzer, used in computer science for concurrent systems
Maria (storage engine), a storage engine for MySQL (renamed Aria in 2010)
Maria reactor, a nuclear research reactor in Poland
MARIA XML, a model-based XML language for User Interfaces
MariaDB, a community-developed branch of the MySQL database

Languages
Maria language (India) (also Madiya), Dravidian language of the Gondi group
Maria language (Papua New Guinea)

Ships
Maria (brigantine), Australian shipwreck of 1840, whose survivors were massacred
, a number of ships with this name
, a Danish cargo ship in service 1946-59

Other uses
Maria 2.0, movement of Roman Catholic women
Marie biscuit, a type of sweet biscuit similar to a Rich Tea biscuit
Tropical Storm Maria (disambiguation), one of several named storms
Most notably Hurricane Maria (2017)

See also

Santa Maria (disambiguation)
Black Maria (disambiguation)
Ave Maria (disambiguation)
 
 
Mario (disambiguation)
Marius (disambiguation)
Mariah (disambiguation)
Marie (disambiguation)
Mariya
Mary (given name)
Marea (disambiguation)

Sammarinese given names